Närpes is a town and municipality of Finland. It is located in Western Finland and is part of the Ostrobothnia region. Economically, the municipality is known for extensive greenhouse farming of tomatoes and manufacture of trailers for trucks.

Närpes has been a bilingual municipality since 2016. Before that, Närpes was the last unilingually Swedish-speaking municipality in continental Finland. Most locals speak a divergent variety of Ostrobothnian Swedish. The bands who sing in that dialect include 1G3B and Nektor.

The most significant main roads in Närpes are Highway 8 between Turku and Vaasa, and Highway 67 between Kaskinen and Seinäjoki.

History 
Närpes has a history that can be dated back to 1331, when Klas Bengtsson in "Nærpes" pawned goods to bishop Bengt in Turku.

In 1348 king Magnus IV of Sweden declared "all who live in Nerpis socken, Mustasaari socken and Pedersöre socken" the right to buy and sell "all eatables". Thus creating the first official marketplaces in Ostrobothnia.

Demographics

Närpes has attracted many immigrants, and has also welcomed refugees.

Largest immigrant groups:
  Vietnam (403)
  Bosnia and Herzegovina (388)
  Sweden (254)
  Yugoslavia (254)
  Thailand (58)
  Russia (54)
  Ukraine (51)
  Estonia (42)
  Croatia (32)
  Lithuania (30)
  United States (28)
  Ecuador (25)

International relations

Twin towns — Sister cities
Närpes is twinned with:

  Akranes, Iceland  
  Bamble, Norway
  Tønder, Denmark  
  Västervik Municipality, Sweden

See also
 Bothnian Highway
 Kaskinen

References

External links

Town of Närpes – Official website

Municipalities of Ostrobothnia (region)
Cities and towns in Finland
Populated coastal places in Finland
Populated places established in 1867